Tyra Ferrell (born january 28, 1962) is an American actress. She is known for her roles in films Boyz n the Hood (1991), Jungle Fever (1991), White Men Can't Jump (1992), and Poetic Justice (1993).

On television, she had starring roles in short-lived series The Bronx Zoo (1987−88) and City (1990), and recurred on Thirtysomething (1989−90), ER (1994) and Empire (2015). Throughout her career, Ferrell has been nominated for two NAACP Image Awards.

Life and career
Ferrell was born in Houston, Texas. She moved from Houston to New York after high school and began her career on stage including roles on Lena Horne: The Lady and Her Music (1981), as part of the Cotton Club chorus, and Ain't Misbehavin on Broadway. 

She made her screen debut in a small role in the 1981 comedy film So Fine, and later appeared in Lady Beware, School Daze, The Mighty Quinn, and The Exorcist III. On television, she guest-starred in Hill Street Blues,  The Twilight Zone, and Quantum Leap. Ferrell's first major role on television was Roberta in drama The Bronx Zoo (1987−88). She had recurring roles on Square One Television  and Thirtysomething. In 1990, Ferrell was a regular cast member on the short-lived CBS sitcom City starring Valerie Harper, portraying secretary Wanda Jenkins.

In 1991, Ferrell played supporting roles in two films. She appeared as matriarch Brenda Baker in Boyz n the Hood. A critic believed Ferrell gave a "fine edge" to the character of Mrs. Baker. Ferrell earned an NAACP Image Award nomination for Outstanding Actress in a Motion Picture for her role in Boyz n the Hood. She portrayed Orin Goode, the love interest of John Torturro's character, in Jungle Fever. In the same year, she was listed as one of twelve "Promising New Actors of 1991" in John A. Willis' Screen World. The following year, she starred alongside Wesley Snipes as his wife Rhonda in the comedy film White Men Can't Jump. She later had supporting roles as Sonya, a janitor, in Equinox (1992) and a beauty salon owner named Jessie in Poetic Justice (1993).

Ferrell also played the leading role of prosecutor Cutter Dubuque alongside Mare Winningham in the 1993 Lifetime Television movie Better Off Dead. Ferrell received positive reviews for her performance in this film. One reviewer claimed she "breathed life" into her character. Another critic found Ferrell's portrayal "smooth," and a third opined Ferrell was "impressive." In 1994, she had the recurring role as Dr. Sarah Langworthy during the first season of the NBC medical drama ER, and from 1996 to 1997 she co-starred alongside Corbin Bernsen on the syndicated science fiction series The Cape as Tamara St. James.

In 2000, Ferrell co-starred alongside Khandi Alexander in the HBO miniseries The Corner. She later guest-starred on Soul Food, The Shield and Law & Order: Special Victims Unit. In 2005, she was nominated for her second NAACP Image Award, in the category of Outstanding Actress in a Television Movie, Mini-Series or Dramatic Special for her role in the ABC television film NTSB: The Crash of Flight 323. After 2004, Ferrell took a break from acting.

She returned to acting ten years later with the leading role in Tasha Smith's directorial debut, Boxed In. In 2015, Ferrell was cast in a recurring role on the second season of Fox's prime-time soap opera Empire as Roxanne Ford, an attorney.

Filmography

Film

Television

Awards and nominations

References

External links

1962 births
American film actresses
Living people
African-American actresses
American television actresses
20th-century American actresses
21st-century American actresses
20th-century African-American women
20th-century African-American people
21st-century African-American women
21st-century African-American people